James Kern may refer to:
 James V. Kern (1909–1966), American singer, songwriter, screenwriter, actor, and director
 Jim Kern (born 1949), American baseball pitcher